Coryphellina exoptata, which can be translated as the much-desired flabellina or desirable flabellina, is a species of colourful sea slug, a nudibranch, a marine gastropod mollusc in the family Flabellinidae.

Distribution
This species was described from Madang, Papua New Guinea. Coryphellina exoptata is widespread throughout the tropical waters of the Indo-West Pacific.

Description

References

External links
 

Gastropods described in 1991
Flabellinidae